Johann Christoph Rincklake (19 October 1764, in Harsewinkel – 19 June 1813, in Münster) was a German portrait painter of the Romantic era, with a high standing in international art history.

Life
The son of a carpenter, he took an apprenticeship then began training as an artist, studying at Berlin's Prussian Academy of Arts and the painting academies in Vienna, Frankfurt am Main and Düsseldorf, spending a few years in each. In 1800 he married Marianne Wermerskirch - they had five children and lived together in Münster.

He painted portraits of several noble and civic figures in North Rhine Westphalia, including Franz von Fürstenberg, count Friedrich Leopold zu Stolberg-Stolberg, Gebhard Leberecht von Blücher, Freiherr vom Stein and princess Pauline zur Lippe, as well as several families from Münster and Petrus von Hatzfeld, the last abbot of Marienfeld Abbey. He also painted portraits of working-class subjects - an innkeeper's daughter, a locksmith's son, a baker to the cathedral chapter, a tutor and a singer in the Prince-Bishop's Chapel. Several of his paintings have been catalogued (including those by him in the Landesmuseum in Münster), but others are lost or missing.  A large number of images have been cataloged, but other images are missing.

Gallery

Bibliography
 Hildegard Westhoff-Krummacher: Johann Christoph Rincklake - Ein westfälischer Bildnismaler um 1800, Deutscher Kunstverlag, 1984,

External links

 

1764 births
1813 deaths
German portrait painters
18th-century German painters
18th-century German male artists
German male painters
19th-century German painters
19th-century German male artists
People from Harsewinkel